Judith Claire Herrera (born April 28, 1954) is an American attorney and jurist serving as a senior United States district judge of the United States District Court for the District of New Mexico.

Early life and education

Born in Chicago, Illinois, Herrera received a Bachelor of Arts degree from the University of New Mexico in 1976 and a Juris Doctor from Georgetown University Law Center in 1979.

Career 
Herrera served as an assistant district attorney in Santa Fe, New Mexico, from 1979 to 1980, and was then in private practice in Santa Fe until 2004. She was a member of the Santa Fe City Council from 1981 to 1986.

Federal judicial service

On September 23, 2003, Herrera was nominated by President George W. Bush to a seat on the United States District Court for the District of New Mexico vacated by James Aubrey Parker. She was confirmed by the United States Senate on June 3, 2004, and received her commission on June 13, 2004. She assumed senior status on July 1, 2019.

See also
List of Hispanic/Latino American jurists

References

External links

1954 births
Living people
University of New Mexico alumni
Georgetown University Law Center alumni
Hispanic and Latino American judges
Judges of the United States District Court for the District of New Mexico
United States district court judges appointed by George W. Bush
21st-century American judges
People from Chicago
New Mexico city council members
21st-century American women judges
Hispanic and Latino American people in New Mexico politics